Delhi Township may refer to the following places in the United States:

 Delhi Township, Delaware County, Iowa
 Delhi Charter Township, Michigan
 Delhi Township, Minnesota
 Delhi Township, Hamilton County, Ohio

Township name disambiguation pages